

Champions
 World Series: Boston Red Sox over Brooklyn Robins (4-1)

Awards and honors
 MLB Most Valuable Player Award
 None

MLB statistical leaders

Major league baseball final standings

American League final standings

National League final standings

Events
January 5 – Charles H. Weeghman, former president of the Federal League Chicago Whales  club, agreed to pay $500,000 in cash to Charles P. Taft for the stock the Chicago Cubs of the National League. Weegman, owner of a popular restaurant chain, headed a syndicate including the chewing gum manufacturer William Wrigley Jr., who became a minority stock holder by putting up $50,000. Whales manager Joe Tinker succeeds Roger Bresnahan, and the Cubs will play in the Federal League's newly built ballpark on the North Side, soon to become known as Wrigley Field. Weeghman would become the first to officially allow fans to keep any and all balls hit into the stands.
January 17 – The New York Giants acquire pitcher Fred Anderson, outfielder Benny Kauff and catcher Bill Rariden,  three stars from the defunct Federal League.
January 24 – At the International League owner's meeting, President Ed Barrow announced that the Richmond Climbers	would return to Baltimore, where the team had played until 1914. The Harrisburg Senators in turn relocated to Richmond.
February 7 – The Federal League's year-old suit charging antitrust violations by organized baseball is dismissed by mutual consent in U.S. District Court in Chicago by Judge Kenesaw Mountain Landis. No appellate decision is written and it will not be until 1922 when the courts rule on antitrust law.
February 18 - James R. Price and Fred Tenney purchased the Jersey City Skeeters from the International League, which had controlled the club since 1915. Price and Tenney moved the team to Newark, New Jersey.
April 12 – Taking the ball on Opening Day, Babe Ruth won over the Philadelphia Athletics, 2–1, to start the Boston Red Sox off to a streak of six victories in their first eight games.
May 9 –  The Philadelphia Athletics and the Detroit Tigers combined to set a Major League record with thirty walks during a 16–2, Tigers win. Eighteen walks were issued by the Athletics, who went on to finish the season with 715. Detroit added eleven more the following day for a two-game Major League record of twenty-nine.
June 16 – Tom Hughes tosses a no-hitter for the Boston Braves in a 2–0 victory over the Pittsburgh Pirates.
June 21 – Rube Foster pitches a no-hitter as the Boston Red Sox defeat the New York Yankees, 2–0.
June 22 – The Boston Braves pulled off a triple steal in the eleventh inning, to defeat the New York Giants, 3–1. It is the only extra-inning triple steal in National League history. In 1941, the American League would match the feat with their only recorded extra-inning triple swipe.
June 28 – William Fischer of the Chicago Cubs set a Major League record by catching all twenty-seven innings of a doubleheader against the Pittsburgh Pirates.  The Pirates won the first game, which went 9 innings, by a score of 3 – 2, and the second game, which went 18 innings, by the same score.
August 15 – Babe Ruth of the Boston Red Sox outdueled Washington Senators ace Walter Johnson, 1–0, in a contest played at Fenway Park. From the 7th inning on, Ruth surrendered just an infield single by Clyde Milan in the 11th frame. Milan also prived Ruth of a home run in the 12th by grabbing a ball heading into the right field stands. Ruth is now 3–0 in his pitching meetings with Johnson.
August 26 – Despite his team suffering through perhaps the worst season in baseball history, Philadelphia Athletics hurler Bullet Joe Bush tosses a no-hitter against the Cleveland Indians.  Philadelphia wins, 5–0.
August 29 –  Boston Red Sox pitcher Dutch Leonard allowed two runs on two hits, one walk, one hit-by-pitch and a wild pitch, before being relieved during the first inning of a game against the St. Louis Browns. One day later, Leonard pitched a 4–0 no-hitter versus the Browns.
September 8 – Philadelphia Athletics switch-hitter Wally Schang belted two home runs against the New York Yankees, to become the first player in Major League history to hit home runs from both sides of the plate during a single game.
September 17 – St. Louis Browns pitcher George Sisler out-duels the Washington Senators' legend Walter Johnson, 1–0. It will be the last Major League pitching victory for Sisler, who will become a member of the Hall of Fame as a first baseman in 1939.
October 12 – The Boston Red Sox defeat the Brooklyn Robins, 4–1, in Game 5 of the World Series to win their second consecutive World Championship and fourth overall. Boston's Babe Ruth pitched 13 shutout innings in Game 2, starting a consecutive scoreless innings streak that would reach 29 in the 1918 Series.
November 29 – In Kansas City, Missouri, pitchers Walter Johnson and Grover Cleveland Alexander face each other for the first time. The exhibition game between the two stars features Zach Wheat, Casey Stengel, Max Carey and Hal Chase, between others. Johnson's team prevail over Alexander's, 3–2.
December 2 – 1916 – Under pressure from the Players' League, the National Commission orders that injured players shall get full pay for the duration of their contracts. The injury clause previously let clubs suspend players after 15 days pay.
Unknown date – Pat Pieper begins 59-year career as public address announcer for the Chicago Cubs

Births

January
January 3 – Chico Hernández
January 6 – Phil Masi
January 7 – Ed Butka
January 8 – Joe Just
January 9 – Charley Stanceu
January 13 – Bama Rowell
January 22 – Alphonso Gerard
January 23 – Johnny Sturm
January 24 – Jack Brickhouse
January 24 – Clem Dreisewerd
January 24 – Wally Judnich
January 25 – Glenn Gardner
January 28 – Bob Muncrief
January 28 – Pat Tobin

February
February 2 – Mike Garbark
February 3 – Daniel Canónico
February 5 – Dewey Williams
February 6 – Don Fisher
February 9 – Tex Hughson
February 9 – Freddy Schmidt
February 11 – George Hausmann
February 11 – Sam Page
February 14 – Grover Froese
February 23 – Eddie Kearse
February 26 – Preacher Roe
February 27 – Don Hanski
February 28 – Howie Krist

March
March 1 – Bing Devine
March 2 – Mickey Rocco
March 3 – Bill Kalfass
March 9 – Woody Rich
March 12 – René Monteagudo
March 18 – Hiram Bithorn
March 18 – Elbie Fletcher
March 18 – Eddie Lake
March 20 – Gordon Houston

April
April 1 – George Staller
April 4 – Mickey Owen
April 4 – Willie Ramsdell
April 11 – Joe Antolick
April 11 – Sam Chapman
April 14 – Johnny Hutchings
April 14 – Jerry Lynn
April 16 – Pete Suder
April 23 – Jack Creel
April 27 – Enos Slaughter
April 28 – Mike Chartak
April 29 – Art Kenney

May
May 1 – Victor Starffin
May 3 – Ken Silvestri
May 12 – Hank Borowy
May 12 – Dixie Parsons
May 14 – Red Hayworth
May 20 – Joe Wood
May 25 – Frank Drews
May 27 – John Dudra

June
June 3 – Max Wilson
June 5 – Eddie Joost
June 6 – Dario Lodigiani
June 15 – Bud Stewart
June 16 – Joe Rullo
June 17 – Joe Burns
June 23 – Ken Jungels
June 27 – Cecil Kaiser
June 27 – Fuzz White
June 28 – Shosei Go

July
July 1 – Bob Prince
July 6 – Bill Donovan
July 9 – Ned Harris
July 15 – Doyt Morris
July 17 – Fred Chapman
July 18 – Johnny Hopp
July 19 – Phil Cavarretta
July 20 – Don Black
July 24 – Al Flair
July 24 – Dick Hahn
July 31 – Billy Hitchcock

August
August 1 – Pep Rambert
August 1 – Floyd Stromme
August 8 – Ed Steele
August 10 – Buddy Lewis
August 10 – Jim Mertz
August 14 – Fumio Fujimura
August 14 – Irene Hickson
August 15 – Cecil Garriott
August 21 – Murry Dickson
August 22 – Frankie Kelleher
August 24 – Luis Suárez
August 26 – Adrián Zabala
August 30 – Johnny Lindell
August 31 – Danny Litwhiler
August 31 – Ray Mack

September
September 5 – Ernie White
September 7 – Lefty Sullivan
September 8 – Jim Bagby
September 8 – Tom Turner
September 11 – Ellis Clary
September 12 – Ralph Hamner
September 12 – Charlie Keller
September 13 – Roy Zimmerman
September 19 – Rube Fischer
September 19 – Bob McNamara
September 20 – Red Juelich
September 25 – Norm Schlueter
September 28 – Al Evans

October
October 7 – Russ Derry
October 8 – Joe Callahan
October 8 – Rex Cecil
October 10 – Floyd Baker
October 12 – Sam Gentile
October 13 – Ray Hathaway
October 19 – Ralph McLeod
October 21 – Bill Bevens
October 21 – Eddie Carnett
October 22 – Harry Walker
October 28 – Ed Levy
October 30 – Leon Day
October 31 – Ken Keltner

November
November 2 – Al Campanis
November 2 – Fran Matthews
November 4 – Emil Kush
November 5 – Jim Tabor
November 7 – Joe Hatten
November 8 – Andrés Fleitas
November 9 – Walt Lanfranconi
November 13 – Nick Goulish
November 15 – Milt Byrnes
November 15 – Joe Ostrowski
November 18 – Ken Burkhart
November 18 – James Moore
November 23 – Eddie Collins
November 25 – Oscar Georgy
November 26 – Bob Elliott
November 26 – Eddie Miller
November 26 – Walt Ripley
November 28 – Max West

December
December 4 – Ray Sanders
December 5 – Steve Rachunok
December 5 – Len Schulte
December 7 – Jorge Comellas
December 13 – Hank Majeski
December 13 – Lou Thuman
December 14 – Gene Stack
December 24 – Jack Graham
December 27 – Charlie Brewster

Deaths

January–February
January 1 – Jake Drauby, 52, third baseman who hit .206 in ten games for the Washington Senators of the National League in 1892.
January 6 – King Cole, 29, pitcher who was 20-4 and led National League in ERA for the 1910 Chicago Cubs; gave up Babe Ruth's first hit in 1914, and inspired Ring Lardner's "Alibi Ike" stories.
January 20 – Emmet Heidrick, 39, centerfielder for four teams in the National and American leagues between 1898 and 1908, who collected a .300 average and 186 stolen bases in 757 career games.
February 5 – Ed Irwin, 34, third baseman who played one game for the 1912 Detroit Tigers of the American League.
February 14 – Pat Carroll, 62, Union Association catcher and right fielder for the Altoona Mountain City and the Philadelphia Keystones in the 1884 season.
February 25 – Art Allison, 67, outfielder-first baseman who hit .254 for five teams between 1871 and 1876.

March–April
March 4 – Abe Wolstenholme, 55,  catcher for the 1883 Philadelphia Quakers of the National League.
March 7 – Fred Donovan, 51, catcher for the Cleveland Spiders of the National League in 1895.
March 23 – Frank Graves, 55, catcher for the 1886 St. Louis Maroons of the National League.
March 28 – Eddie Hohnhorst, 51, first baseman for the Cleveland Naps of the American League in the 1910 and 1912 seasons.
April 6 – Fred Mann, 58, centerfielder who hit .262 and scored 388 runs in 577 games for five clubs from 1882 to 1887.
April 8 – Bill Moran, 46, National League catcher who hit a .147 average in 39 games with the St. Louis Browns (1892) and the Chicago Colts (1895).
April 16 – Jim McTamany, 52, center fielder for four teams from 1885 to 1891, who led the American Association in runs (140) and walks (112) in 1890, while collecting 255 stolen bases and a .371 on-base percentage in 813 career-games.
April 26 – Skyrocket Smith, first baseman who hit a .238 average with a .349 on-base percentage for the Louisville Colonels of the American Association in 1888.
April 27 – Jul Kustus, 33, outfielder who hit .145 in x games for the 1909 Brooklyn Superbas of the National League.

May–June
May 31 – Bud Sharpe, 34, National League who hit .222 in parts of two seasons for the Boston Beaneaters (1905) and Pittsburgh Pirates (1910).
June 10 – Jack Chapman, 73, one of the foremost players of the early 1860s, who became famous for his many long running catches at right field, receiving the colorful nickname ″Death to Flying Things″; later a highly respected manager from 1876 to 1892, winning one championship in 1890 with the Louisville Colonels of the American Association.
June 19 – John Dodge, 27, National League third baseman for the 1912 Philadelphia Phillies and the 1913 Cincinnati Reds, who died after being hit in the head by a pitch during a minor league game.

July–August
July 15 – Ira Belden, 42, American Association outfielder for the Cleveland Spiders in 1897.
July 22 – George Ziegler, 44[?], who pitched one game for the 1890 Pittsburgh Alleghenys of the National League.
August 15 – John Dyler, 64, left fielder for the Louisville Eclipse American Association team in 1882.
August 23 – Bill George, 51, pitcher/outfielder who played from 1887 through 1889 for the New York Giants (National League) and Columbus Solons (American Association).

September–October
September 2 – Chick Evans, 26, National League pitcher who posted a 1–4 record and a 4.96 ERA in 17 games for the Boston Doves in the 1909 and 1910 seasons, who also hurled a perfect game in the minors in which not a single batter hit a ball out of the infield.
September 23 – Monk Cline, 58, American Association outfielder who hit .261 in 232 games with the Baltimore Orioles, Kansas City Cowboys and the Louisville Eclipse/Colonels between 1882 and 1891.
October 10 – Dick McBride, 71, pitcher-manager for the Philadelphia Athletics of the National Association from 1871 to 1875, who also played for the 1876 Boston Red Caps of the National League.
October 11 – Harry Luff, 64, infielder/outfielder/pitcher who played between 1875 and 1884 for six clubs in four different leagues.
October 13 – Cyclone Miller, 57, pitcher who posted a 14–11 record and a 3.04 ERA in 27 games with four teams in the 1884 and 1886 seasons.
October 16 – Henry Killeen, 44, pitcher for the 1891 Cleveland Spiders of the National League.
October 24 – Hi Ebright, 57, catcher who hit .254 for the Washington Senators of the National League in 1889.
October 31 – Nicholas Young, 76, president of the National League (1885–1902) and league secretary (1876–1902), who also managed the Washington team in the National Association and umpired in that league.

November–December
November 2 – Richard Johns, 67, National Association umpire
November 12 – Mike Roach, 46, catcher for the 1899 Washington Senators of the National League.
November 12 – Will Foley, 60, third baseman who played between 1875 and 1884 for five clubs in three different leagues.
November 15 – Jack Farrell 60, center fielder who hit .385 in three games with the 1874 Hartford Dark Blues of the National Association.
November 29 – Bob Unglaub, 35, American League infielder for the New York Highlanders, Boston Americans and Washington Senators between 1904 and 1910, who also managed the Americans in the 1907 season.
December 3 – Reddy Mack, 50, Irish second baseman who played in the American Association for the Louisville Colonels (1886-'88) and Baltimore Orioles (1889-'90).
December 5 – John Cuff, 52, catcher for the 1884 Baltimore Monumentals of the Union Association.
December 17 – Scoops Carey, 46, a .271 career-hitter with four clubs, who led first basemen in fielding average in both the National League (1895) and American League (1902).
December 17 – Elias Peak, 57, second baseman who hit a combined .202 average with the Boston Reds and Philadelphia Keystones in the 1884 season.
December 19 – Doug Allison, 70, catcher who played from 1868 through 1883 for ten different teams, including for the undefeated 1869 Cincinnati Red Stockings, who is the earliest known player to use a glove, when he donned buckskin mittens to protect his hands in 1870.
December 19 – John McGuinness, 60[?], Irish first baseman and a .244 career hitter in 162 games with the New York Mutuals (1876), Syracuse Stars (1879), and Philadelphia Keystones (1884).
December 23 – Erve Beck, 38, second baseman for four different teams in the American and National Leagues between 1899 and 1902; his 71 doubles in 1900 for minor-league Toledo stood as an Organized Baseball record for 23 years.
December 23 – Howard Earl, 47, outfielder who hit .248 with eight homers and 68 RBI for the 1890 Chicago Colts and the 1890 Milwaukee Brewers.
December 25 – Bill Moriarty, 33, backup shortstop for the 1909 Cincinnati Reds.
December 29 – Ed Doheny, 43, pitcher who played from 1895 through 1903 for the New York Giants and Pittsburgh Pirates, compiling a 75-83 and a 3.73 ERA in 75 games, while allowing only 13 home runs in 1405 innings for a .083 HR/9 average, 16th on all-time list.

References